Nanming may refer to:

Nanming District, in Guiyang, Guizhou, China
Southern Ming, Ming loyalist regimes that existed in Southern China from 1644 to 1662